Miss International 1964, the 5th Miss International pageant, was held on August 14, 1964 at the Long Beach Municipal Auditorium, Long Beach, California, United States. 40 contestants competed in this pageant. Gemma Cruz from the Philippines was crowned the winner of the pageant by outgoing titleholder, Gudrun Bjarnadottir from Iceland. Cruz made history receiving the first Miss International title for the country (the first major title) and in Asia.

Results

Placements

Special Awards

Contestants

  - Viviana Dellavedova
  - Janice Taylor
  - Erika Augustin
  - Eliane Stockmans
  - Vera Lúcia Couto dos Santos
  - Jane Kmita
  - Kathleen Foenander
  - Leonor Duplat Sanjuán
  - Alice Bjorn Andersen
  - Mildred Almonte Rouas
  - Maria Mendoza Velez
  - Tracy Ingram (real name: Iris Ord)
  - Maila Östring
  - Brigitte Pradel
  - Monika Brugger
  - Maria Schinaraki
  - Doris Sablan
  - Henny van der Berg
  - Elisabeth Ottosdóttir
  - Joan Power
  - Daphna Chrisholm Noy
  - Naoko Matsui
  - Lee Hye-jin (real name: Lee Kwang-ja)
  - Norma Dorothy Davis
  - Jeanny Hubert
  - Helen Iggo
  - Ileana del Carmen Rojas Arana
  - Inger Sande
  - Gloria Navarrete
  - Gladys González
  - Gemma Cruz
  - Zoe Foy Santiago
  - Dorothy Smallman
  - Lorraine Mason
  - Lucia Pilar Herrera
  - Birgitta Alverljung
  - Philippina Chao Ling-yu
  - Lea Avaemai
  - Ayten Ornek
  - Linda Taylor
  - Lisla Negrón
  - Pamela Martin

Notes

External links
Pageantopolis - Miss International 1964

1964
20th century in Los Angeles County, California
1964 beauty pageants
Beauty pageants in the United States